"Smile" is the lead single released from Scarface's fourth album, The Untouchable. The song features 2Pac and R&B singer, Johnny P. "Smile" is a remix of the 2Pac song "Smile For Me Now", which was produced by 2Pac and Damon Thomas and was released prior on the Death Row Records compilation album, Death Row Greatest Hits. "Smile" was produced by Scarface, Mike Dean and Tone Capone. The song became Scarface's most successful single to date, making it to number 12 on the Billboard Hot 100.

Music executive J Prince, in a 2018 interview with Rap Radar, stated that he asked Puff Daddy if the Notorious B.I.G. would also like to feature on the song, but after discovering that 2Pac would feature, he declined. The chorus contains an interpolation of "Tell Me If You Still Care" by The S.O.S. Band.

Single track listing

B-Side
"Untouchable" (Radio Edit)- 3:38
"Untouchable" (Instrumental)- 3:59

Music video
The music video was released for the week ending on April 27, 1997.

Charts

Weekly charts

Certifications

References

1997 singles
Scarface (rapper) songs
Tupac Shakur songs
Song recordings produced by Dr. Dre
1997 songs
Songs written by Mike Dean (record producer)
Songs written by Tupac Shakur
American contemporary R&B songs
Music videos directed by Paul Hunter (director)